Fishers is a hamlet in the northwest corner of the Town of Victor, Ontario County, New York, United States. It is a small suburb of Rochester.

The community is south of the New York State Thruway (Interstate 90).

A U. S. Post Office is located in Fishers with a ZIP code of 14453.

Entertainment
Fishers is home to Fishers Park, a town park which is run by the Town of Victor. It contains tennis courts, picnic area, fishing and hiking trails.

Schools
Fishers is part of the Victor Central School District.

External links 
 Map of Fishers, NY

Hamlets in New York (state)
Hamlets in Ontario County, New York